Mihael Klepač (born 19 September 1997) is a Croatian professional footballer who plays as a right winger for Slovenian PrvaLiga club Mura.

Career statistics

Club

References

External links
Mihael Klepač at Sofascore

1997 births
Living people
People from Našice
Association football wingers
Croatian footballers
NK Osijek players
NK Dugopolje players
NK Varaždin players
NK Rudeš players
FK Željezničar Sarajevo players
NK Aluminij players
NŠ Mura players
Croatian Football League players
First Football League (Croatia) players
Premier League of Bosnia and Herzegovina players
Slovenian PrvaLiga players
Croatian expatriate footballers
Expatriate footballers in Bosnia and Herzegovina
Croatian expatriate sportspeople in Bosnia and Herzegovina
Expatriate footballers in Slovenia
Croatian expatriate sportspeople in Slovenia